Dracaena cochinchinensis is a species of Asian tropical forest under-storey plants in the family Asparagaceae; no subspecies are listed in the Catalogue of Life.

Distribution and Description 
The recorded distribution is from southern China to Indo-China. In Vietnam the plant may be called huyết giác, or giáng ông.

D.  cochinchinensis is a shrub, up to 3 m high, with red tubers and leaves 200-800 x 20-30 mm wide.  The flowers are green and later the black berries are about 10 mm in diameter.

References

Gallery

External links 
 
 

cochinchinensis
Flora of Indo-China